Lynette Chico (born April 22, 1971) is a Puerto Rican fashion model, actress and radio host on 98.5 FM Cadena Salsoul Puerto Rican radio station. She has had parts in many of Puerto Rico's television shows.

Puerto Rican television
 Estudio 69 (she plays "La Chacha", a French maid) with Miguel Morales
  Dame un Break
  No te Duermas
  El Super Show
  Channel 52 V Fifty Two (host of the local music show)

Calendars
She has modeled in many calendars, including "2008 Puerto Rican Sensation".

Film
She is part of the cast in Daddy Yankee's upcoming movie Talento de Barrio.

Personal life
Her sister, Leticia Rodriguez, is also an actress.

References

1971 births
People from Bayamón, Puerto Rico
Puerto Rican television actresses
Puerto Rican female models
Living people